Kum Kang Kum Kabi Chang (English: Turning Poet In Dry Season) is a 2015 Indian Meitei language film directed by Bishwamittra and produced by S. Minakumari. The film features Gurumayum Bonny, Leishangthem Rahul, Sonia Hijam and Bala Hijam in the lead roles. The story of the film was written by Dr. M. Priyobrata and screenplay by Bishwamittra. Kum Kang Kum Kabi Chang was released at MSFDS (Manipur State Film Development Society), Imphal, on 15 November 2015. The film was screened in various theatres of Manipur in March 2016.

Kum Kang Kum Kabi Chang is based on Dr. M. Priyobrata's famous radio drama of the same title. It won Akashvani National Award. It is Prithi Theatre's first production.

In spite of its good content, the film could not attract large number of audiences in theatres since it was screened just after the stoppage of screening films in theatres and other film-related activities, which was relaxed in March 2016.

Synopsis
The film tells the story of a poet Khoimu, who never cares about anything else, but sees only poetry. It also shows how this affects his family and life.

Cast
 Gurumayum Bonny as Shougrakpam Khoimu
 Leishangthem Rahul as Thabal
 Sonia Hijam as Thambal
 Bala Hijam as Tharo
 Surjit Saikhom as Koklei
 Jasmin Elangbam as Memcha
 Hijam Shyamdhani as Gulap, Thambal's Father
 R.K. Hemabati as Thambal's Mother
 Khelen Singh
 Sarat Salam
 Yumnam Surchandra
 Meidingu Tonjao
 Biswamitra Sharma
 W. Modhuchandra
 Khistina (Child Artiste)

Soundtrack
O. Geet composed the soundtrack for the film and Bishwamittra and Dr. M. Priyobrata wrote the lyrics. The songs are titled Khwangjenba Khoiraba and Kum Kang Kum Gi Kabi.

References

2010s Meitei-language films
2015 films